The District of Columbia Sociological Society (DCSS), founded in 1934, is a non-profit organization that serves professional sociologists and students of sociology in the Greater Washington Metropolitan region.

Mission
The objectives of the Society are to promote sociological research, education and discussion, to facilitate cooperative exchanges among persons and organizations engaged in sociological research and teaching, to encourage young sociologists and students, and to increase the contribution of sociology to human welfare.

Membership
Any person interested in the objectives of the Society shall be eligible for membership. Members of the Society are persons who have paid dues to the Society for the current official year. Only persons whose dues are paid for the current official year may vote in the annual election.

External links
 District of Columbia Sociological Society

References

Sociological organizations